USS Boulder Victory (AK-227) was a  acquired by the US Navy during World War II.  She was the lead ship of 20 ships in her class. She carried ammunition into the Pacific Ocean war zone and, on 20 December 1944 at Manus, New Guinea, she struck a naval mine and suffered a very large hole in her side.

Her ammunition did not explode due to the sudden inrush of seawater; however, her operations were somewhat limited after that event and post-war she returned to the United States for disposal by the Navy and a continued maritime career.

Construction
Boulder Victory was laid down on 18 June 1944, at Richmond, California, by Permanente Metals Corporation, Yard No. 1, under a Maritime Commission (MARCOM) contract, MCV hull 536; launched on 31 August; sponsored by Miss Elsa Maxwell; transferred to the Navy on 12 October; and commissioned the same day.

Service history
On 17 October, the newly commissioned cargo ship sailed to San Francisco, California, to begin duty as an ammunition supply vessel. Her holds were filled by 2 November, and Boulder Victory got underway for the western Pacific.

In order to support the Allied advances to the west and north, forward ammunition replenishment stations were established at Ulithi Atoll in the Western Caroline Islands and Kossol Passage in the Palau Islands. Boulder Victory received orders to transfer ammunition between these bases as needed. She made port at Eniwetok on 17 November to refuel, entered the lagoon at Ulithi on 30 November, and reached Kossol Passage on 8 December.

Kossol Passage ultimately proved to be unsuitable for ammunition handling owing to chronic heavy swells, the lack of storage facilities ashore, and the shortage of personnel to unload the supplies, as well as its proximity to Japanese-held Babelthuap Island. Floating mines from that island were a constant danger.

Striking a mine
On 20 December, as Boulder Victory set out for Manus, she struck one of those mines on her port side. The explosion tore a hole in her No. 3 hold that measured . The hold contained  projectiles, but the fires started by the explosion were extinguished by the rapid rush of seawater into the space. As a consequence, only two shells exploded, leaving two  holes in the skin of the ship. Boulder Victory remained afloat, although low in the water; and, after emergency repairs to the engines, managed to get into Palau again on her own power. Her crew suffered no casualties, but the damage to the ship was so severe that her wartime operations ended.

The cargo ship remained anchored at Kossol Passage unloading ammunition and cleaning debris from the hold until 8 February 1945. She then slowly steamed to Manus to unload the remainder of her cargo and to enter a floating dry dock for further repairs. Finally, on 13 June, Boulder Victorys temporary repairs made her seaworthy again, and she set course via Pearl Harbor for San Francisco. On 30 June, the ship began a major overhaul by United Engineering Company at Alameda, California, to complete the repairs.

End-of-war operations
Boulder Victory was still in overhaul when the Japanese capitulated in August; but, on 1 September, the cargo ship began shakedown and training exercises off San Diego, California. She got underway on 10 October, to carry supplies to the occupation troops in Japan. After a refueling stop at Eniwetok, Boulder Victory continued on to Okinawa where she arrived on 30 October.

She unloaded her cargo and embarked returning veterans. On 10 November, she set sail for the United States.

Post-war decommissioning
After discharging her passengers, the ship sailed for San Francisco, where she commenced demilitarization on 5 December and was returned to the War Shipping Administration (WSA) on 4 January 1946. Her name was struck from the Navy list on 21 January 1946.

War Relief and Seacowboys

In 1946 after World War II the Boulder Victory was converted to a livestock ship, also called a cowboy ship. From 1945 to 1947 the United Nations Relief and Rehabilitation Administration and the Brethren Service Committee of the Church of the Brethren sent livestock to war-torn countries. These "seagoing cowboys" made about 360 trips on 73 different ships. The Heifers for Relief project was started by the Church of the Brethren in 1942; in 1953 this became Heifer International. The SS Boulder Victory was one of these ships, known as cowboy ships, as she moved livestock across the Atlantic Ocean.  Boulder Victory made six trips moved horses, heifers, and mules as well as a some chicks, rabbits, and goats. In 1947 with her war and relief work done she was laid up in the Wilmington Group and later transferred to Suisun Bay as part of the National Defense Reserve Fleet.

Merchant service
During 1946 and 1947, Boulder Victory was operated by Parry Navigation Company She was then inactivated and laid up at Wilmington, North Carolina, until 1951, when she began operations for the Isbrantsen Company, Inc., and then for the American-Hawaiian Steamship Company. On 29 October 1953, she was transferred to the National Defense Reserve Fleet, at Suisun Bay, California.

On 20 May 1957, American President Lines (APL) removed Boulder Victory so that the University of California could conduct thermal stress tests on her. She was returned 3 September 1957.

She was removed 1 December 1983, for scrapping by C.J.W. Shipping & Trading Company. She was scrapped in Kaohsiung, Taiwan, between 1983 and 1984.

Awards
Qualified Boulder Victory personnel were eligible for the following:
 American Campaign Medal
 Asiatic-Pacific Campaign Medal
 World War II Victory Medal

Notes 

Citations

Bibliography 

Online resources

External links
 

Boulder Victory-class cargo ships
Ships built in Richmond, California
1944 ships
Ammunition ships of the United States Navy
Transports of the United States Navy
World War II auxiliary ships of the United States
Suisun Bay Reserve Fleet
James River Reserve Fleet
Wilmington Reserve Fleet